May Britt (born May Britt Wilkens; 22 March 1934) is a Swedish actress who had a brief career in the 1950s in Italy and later in the United States. She was married to American entertainer Sammy Davis Jr. from 1960 to 1968.

Career

Britt was discovered as a teenager by Italian filmmakers Carlo Ponti and Mario Soldati in 1951. She was then an assistant to a Stockholm photographer. The two filmmakers were in Sweden to cast a young blonde for the title role in Jolanda, the Daughter of the Black Corsair. They came to the studio where she worked to view photographs of models. After meeting her, they offered her the part. May Britt, as she was renamed professionally, moved to Rome. As expected, she made her movie debut as the leading actress in Jolanda, the Daughter of the Black Corsair (1952). (Gary Fishgall, in Gonna Do Great Things: The Life of Sammy Davis Jr., wrote of Britt, "... she made her film debut in Le Infideli in 1952.")

In the following years she worked in some ten Cinecittà productions. She also featured in the epic film War and Peace of 1956.

In the late 1950s, Britt relocated to Hollywood after signing with 20th Century Fox. She starred in a few movies, including The Young Lions (1958) with Marlon Brando and Montgomery Clift, The Hunters (1958) with Robert Mitchum and Robert Wagner and Murder, Inc. (1960) with Peter Falk, as well as a much-criticised remake of The Blue Angel (1959) in the legendary role first created by Marlene Dietrich in 1930.

Marriage and retirement
Britt married Edwin Gregson, a college student, in 1958. In 1959 she filed for divorce.

She met Sammy Davis Jr. in 1959. They began dating, and, after a brief engagement, were married on 13 November 1960. Their wedding caused controversy. A rumour or myth was that John F. Kennedy and Robert F. Kennedy told Frank Sinatra to tell Davis not to marry May until after the 1960 Presidential Election. At that time interracial marriage was forbidden by law in 31 U.S. states, and only in 1967 were those laws (by then down to 17 states) ruled unconstitutional by the U.S. Supreme Court. Prior to the wedding, Britt converted to Judaism. The couple were married by Reform Rabbi William M. Kramer. It has been confirmed, however, by Sammy and Britt's daughter Tracey, Nancy Sinatra, and documentarian Sam Pollard that this marriage resulted in President Kennedy rejecting an invitation for Davis to perform at his Inauguration. Yet, Harry Belafonte who was married to a white woman at the time, was invited to perform.

Once married, Britt left the movies. She and Davis had a daughter, Tracey (b. 5 July 1961 – d. 2 November 2020), and adopted two sons: Mark Sidney Davis (born 1960, adopted 4 June 1963) and Jeff (born 1963). They divorced in 1968 after Davis reportedly had an affair with dancer Lola Falana.

After the divorce, Britt resumed working with sporadic television guest appearances, the last in 1988. Since then she has been retired and mainly involved in painting. She currently resides in California. Her third husband, Lennart Ringquist, died in 2017.

In popular culture
May Britt was portrayed by Megan Dodds in the 1998 television film The Rat Pack which depicted her marriage to Sammy Davis Jr., who was played by Don Cheadle.

Selected filmography

References

External links

1934 births
Living people
Converts to Reform Judaism
People from Uppland
Actresses from Stockholm
Swedish expatriates in Italy
Swedish expatriates in the United States
Swedish film actresses
Swedish television actresses
Swedish former Christians
Swedish Jews
Sammy Davis Jr.